Cry Young is an album by American jazz pianist Ahmad Jamal featuring performances recorded in 1967 and released on the Cadet label.

Critical reception
Allmusic awarded the album 3 stars calling it a "Fine, enjoyable date from his peak period of popularity".

Track listing
 "A Beautiful Friendship" (Sammy Cahn, Jule Styne) – 3:07 
 "Where Is Love?" (Lionel Bart) – 2:34
 "Little Ditty" (Ahmad Jamal) – 2:23
 "Who Needs Manhattan" (Bob Williams) – 3:54
 "Minor Moods" (Jamal, Jamil Nasser) – 2:21 
 "Cry Young" (Williams) – 3:43
 "Nature Boy" (eden ahbez) – 3:15     
 "There Are Such Things" (Stanley Adams, Abel Baer, George W. Meyer) – 3:24
 "Call Me Irresponsible" (Jimmy Van Heusen, Sammy Cahn) – 2:53    
 "Tropical Breeze" (Nasser) – 3:00   
 "C'est si Bon" (Henri Betti) – 2:35

Personnel
Ahmad Jamal – piano, arranger
Jamil Nasser – bass
Frank Gant – drums
The Howard Roberts Choir – vocals
Hale Smith – conductor

References 

Cadet Records albums
Ahmad Jamal albums
1967 albums